Simochromis is a genus of cichlids endemic to Lake Tanganyika in Africa.

Species
There is currently one recognized species are in this genus:

 Simochromis diagramma (Günther, 1894)

Four other species have been included, but are now generally in Pseudosimochromis:

 Pseudosimochromis babaulti (Pellegrin, 1927)
 Pseudosimochromis curvifrons (Poll, 1942)
 Pseudosimochromis margaretae G. S. Axelrod & J. A. Harrison, 1978
 Pseudosimochromis marginatus (Poll, 1956)

References 

 
Tropheini
Cichlid genera
Taxa named by George Albert Boulenger
Taxonomy articles created by Polbot